SNY is a TV network in New York City, United States.

SNY, or sny, may also refer to:

 SNY, the IATA code for Sidney Municipal Airport in the state of Nebraska, US
 sny, the ISO 639-3 code for the Sanio language spoken in Papua New Guinea
 SNY, the Nasdaq ticker symbol for Sanofi, multinational pharmaceutical company based in Paris, France
 SNY, the National Rail code for Sunnymeads railway station in the county of Berkshire, UK

See also